Paulette Ramsay is a Jamaican poet, translator, journalist, novelist, and academic who studies race relations in the Caribbean.

Career and writing
She received her PhD from the University of the West Indies; was promoted to professor in the university's Department of Modern Languages & Literatures in 2017; and specializes in the field of Afro-Hispanic Studies, with a particular interest in the Afro-Mexican diaspora.

In 2003 Ramsay published a novella, Aunt Jen, a coming-of-age story told as a series of letters from a girl, Sunshine, to her absent mother. It explores themes of growing up in Jamaica in the 1970s, during the early years of the country's independence. In a review, Maureen Warner-Lewis notes Ramsay's "charmingly revelatory" narrative, and notes her use of code-switching in her literary style.

Ramsay has published three collections of free verse poems. Reviewer Barbara Collash describes the first volume, Under Basil Leaves (2010), as displaying a "decidedly female perspective, female sensibility," and says they "constitute a fresh poetic retelling of the black tragic."

She has also published or contributed to numerous textbooks, preparatory texts for the CAPE and CSEC exams, and academic texts.

Honours

In 2014, Ramsay received the National Order of Merit from the government of France, in the rank of Chevalier.

In 2018 she received the Farquharson Institute of Public Affairs (FIPA) Award of the Century for Outstanding Scholarship in Literary and Language Studies and Creative Writing.

Selected works
Fiction
Aunt Jen (2003; novella)

Poetry
Under Basil Leaves (2010)
October Afternoon (2012)
Star Apple Blue and Avocado Green (2016)

Nonfiction
Chevere! (2008; in Spanish; with Anne-Maria Bankay, Ingrid Kemchand, and Elaine Watson-Grant)
Blooming With The Pouis: Critical Thinking, Reading And Writing Across The Curriculum (2009)
Afro-Mexican Constructions of Diaspora, Gender, Identity and Nation (2016)
The Afro-Hispanic Readers and Anthology (2018; editor)

Translations
On Friday Night, by Luz Argentina Chiriboga (2009; with Anne-Maria Bankay)

References

Further reading

Year of birth missing (living people)
Living people
Knights of the Ordre national du Mérite
University of the West Indies academics
University of the West Indies alumni
21st-century Jamaican novelists
21st-century Jamaican poets
21st-century Jamaican women writers
Jamaican women novelists
Jamaican women poets
Jamaican non-fiction writers
Jamaican women academics
Linguists from Jamaica
Spanish–English translators
21st-century translators